Kingdom Come is the debut studio album by American heavy metal band Sir Lord Baltimore, released on Mercury Records in 1970. The album is considered an important pioneer in stoner rock and heavy metal.

Writing and recording 
All of the songs on Kingdom Come were co-written and arranged by Mike Appel, who would later become Bruce Springsteen's manager. Co-produced by Appel and Jim Cretecos, the album was recorded at Vantone Studios in West Orange, New Jersey, before being mixed by Eddie Kramer and Kim King at Electric Lady Studios in New York, New York. Kramer is well known for his work with Jimi Hendrix, the Beatles, the Rolling Stones, Kiss, Led Zeppelin, David Bowie and Curtis Mayfield.

Musical style 
This album is notable for the fact that its 1971 review in Creem contains an early documented use of the term "heavy metal" to refer to a style of music. It features distorted guitars and bass, enhanced by extensive use of multi-tracking, and has been compared to Deep Purple, Blue Cheer, Van Halen, Kiss and the Stooges.

Release 

Kingdom Come was released in December 1970.

It was reissued on PolyGram in 1994, on Red Fox in 2003, and on Anthology Recordings in 2007. The 1994 and 2003 re-releases also contained 1971's Sir Lord Baltimore. The re-release has a different track listing than the source material, transposing the original records' A- and B-sides. This compilation featured the same cover image used on Kingdom Come, only with that album's title removed.

Reception 

Kingdom Come has received acclaim from critics, and its influence on heavy metal music is well-noted.

In his retrospective review, Marcos Hassan of Tiny Mix Tapes called it "[one] of those great records where not a second is wasted".

Loudwire named it in #68 in their list "Top 70 Hard Rock + Metal Albums of the 1970s" and has called "one of the earliest true hard rock albums."

The album ranked on the list "10 Essential Proto-metal Albums", by Classic Rock.

Track listing 

 Note

The cassette release of the album transposes the tracks "Lady of Fire" and "Hell Hound" in order to even the runtime of sides A and B.

 2007 reissue

Anthology Recordings' 2007 re-release contains an altered track listing, transposing sides A and B of the original record. (Polygram and Red Fox's reissues also used this track listing.)

Personnel 

 Sir Lord Baltimore

 John Garner - lead vocals, drums
 Louis Dambra - guitar
 Gary Justin - bass

 Technical

 Mike Appel – production
 Jim Cretecos – production
 Eddie Kramer – engineering
 Kim King – engineering

References

External links 

 

Sir Lord Baltimore albums
1970 debut albums
Albums produced by Eddie Kramer
Albums produced by Mike Appel
Albums recorded at Electric Lady Studios
Mercury Records albums
Anthology Recordings albums
PolyGram albums
Albums produced by Kim King